Santa's Village Amusement & Water Park (formerly known and colloquially referred to this day as simply Santa's Village) is a theme park in East Dundee, Illinois. It was originally built by Glenn Holland, who also built two other Santa's Villages, in California; one located in San Bernardino County and the other in Santa Cruz County. The Illinois park, the third to be built, was intended to be the flagship of a chain of Santa's Villages across the country. However, parks planned for Richmond, Virginia and Cherry Hill, New Jersey, were never built, and the park in East Dundee became the last of its kind.

The park operated as Santa's Village from 1959 until 2006, when it closed. Five years later, after extensive rehabilitation, the park reopened under new ownership. Renamed Santa's Village Azoosment Park because of the shared focus on both rides and animals, the Azoosment Park has nearly twenty rides and attractions, and hundreds of exotic and farm animals in an interactive environment. For a short time in 1972 the park was named Worlds of Fun. To avert legal feuds with other parks with similar names, the name was changed again to Three Worlds of Santa's Village. In 2021, the park updated its name to Santa's Village Amusement & Water Park.

About the park
The buildings were modeled on what an average child might imagine Santa's Village would look like. When it opened, it was a very prominent theme park. Over the park's history more than 20 million people passed through the front gates.

Initially, rides were purchased individually with colored coins that allowed riders so much time on the attractions. Admission to the park was free. This was eventually abandoned for a one-price admission policy with access to all rides, a model that continued until the end of the park's life.

History

1959–2006
The park opened on May 30, 1959. One addition to the park, opened in 1963, was the "Polar Dome" which provided an ice skating and hockey venue under a forced-air supported dome. On November 28, 1966, a strong wind caused the "Polar Dome" to collapse. The dome was then replaced by a flat cedar roof, although the name of the venue was not changed.

Three Worlds (1972–2006)
In 1972, the park was purchased by the Medina Investors, who renamed it Worlds of Fun. However, to preclude involvement in trademark-infringing lawsuits with amusement parks employing the exact name, they renamed it again to the Three Worlds of Santa's Village.

Santa's World This was the original area and focal point of the park. It was located north of the Polar Dome. It had attractions such as Santa's House, where visitors could get a picture with Santa, the North Pole, a live theater, Frog Hopper, Balloon Ride, Snowball Ride, Giant Slide, Convoy, Train, and the Dragon Coaster.
Old McDonald's Farm This replaced the Reindeer Barn and consolidated all of the roaming animals to one spot in the park. It had attractions such as the Pony Ride, Petting Zoo, and Animal Pens where the animals were stored at night. The animals were sold before the park closed in 2005.
Coney Island This was the southern area of the park and last to be developed. It had many attractions such as Tilt-a-whirl, The Yo-yo, Himalaya, Galleon Ship, Bumble bee, and the Magic Show. This area is now occupied by Paintball Explosion.

In 1983, the park owners added Racing Rapids Action Park to the north end of Santa's Village.

Although the parks were connected, there were separate admission gates to either one. A combination ticket was available at either park that would permit visitors to enter both parks that day. Both parks had separate parking lots.

Water Park (1983–2006)
The water park Racing Rapids was the water park attached to the north side of Santa's Village AZoosment Park. When it opened, it was one of the first in the Midwest and the largest in Illinois. It was closed with the park in 2005 and has not reopened. In 2015, the water park was under demolition.

Closure (2006)
The unsuccessful launch of the "Typhoon" roller coaster, decreased attention to the aesthetics of the park, and a decline of patrons eventually prompted the corporation to sell. The sale did not proceed as smoothly as hoped and, with many setbacks and unmet deadlines, the park had to shut its doors.

In August 2006, the park announced its permanent closure. Most of the rides and fixtures were auctioned in October 2006.

Reopening (2011)
Paintball Explosion opened on half of the site of the original Santa's Village on April 30, 2011. Paintball Explosion converted the existing Polar Dome ice rink into an indoor paintball field. Paintball Explosion built six outdoor fields within the existing park, reusing many of the outdoor structures.

Azoosmentpark opened on May 27 on the other half of original Santa's Village property. They feature various attractions and rides, while also providing exotic pets on exhibit.

According to the park's website, it included two rides from the now-defunct Kiddieland Amusement Park. Those rides are the Midge-O-Racers and the Kiddie Whip Ride. Some of the original Santa's Village rides have also been restored to working order. 2013 saw several new additions including a roller coaster.

Lists of attractions

Roller coasters

Rides & attractions

Other venues

Food & beverages

List of former attractions

See also
Santa's Village (Lake Arrowhead)

References

External links
Santa's Village Official Site
Santa's Village Official Facebook Site
Santa's Village Official Site (archive.org, 1998-2006)
Image of Americas - Santa's Village 
Santa's Village Gone Wild - Tales of Summer Fun, Hijinx, and Debauchery as Told by Those Who Worked There 
Santa's Village Gone Wild Book Website
Santa's Village Fan Page

Paintball Explosion's Official Site
TV commercials at The Museum of Classic Chicago Television

Amusement parks in Illinois
1959 establishments in Illinois
2006 disestablishments in Illinois
2011 establishments in Illinois
Buildings and structures in Kane County, Illinois
Santa Claus
Tourist attractions in Kane County, Illinois
Amusement parks opened in 1959